The 2021–22 Svenska Cupen is the 66th season of the Svenska Cupen and the tenth season with the current format. The winners of the competition will secure a spot in the second qualifying round of the 2022–23 UEFA Europa Conference League, unless they had already qualified for European competition in the 2021–22 season, in which case the qualification spot will go to fourth-placed team of the 2021 Allsvenskan. A total of 96 clubs will enter the competition, 64 teams from district sites and 32 from the Allsvenskan and the Superettan.

Round dates
The schedule of the competition is as follows.

Teams

Round 1

First round matches were played between 9 June and 10 July. 64 clubs from the third tier or lower of the Swedish league system competed in this round.

Matches

Round 2
64 teams competed in this round: 32 winners from Round 1 and the 32 teams from the 2021 Allsvenskan and 2021 Superettan.

Matches

Group stage
The group stage was drawn on 5 December 2021. The 32 winners from round 2 were divided into eight groups of four teams. The 16 highest ranked winners from the previous rounds were seeded to the top two positions in each group and the 16 remaining winners went unseeded in the draw. The ranking of the 16 seeded teams was decided by league position in the 2021 season. All teams in the group stage played each other once, the highest-ranked teams from the previous rounds and teams from tier three or lower played two home matches.

Qualified teams

Seeded
AIK (1)
BK Häcken (1)
Degerfors IF (1)
Djurgårdens IF (1)
Halmstads BK (1)
Hammarby IF (1)
IF Elfsborg (1)
IFK Göteborg (1)
IFK Norrköping (1)
IK Sirius (1)
Kalmar FF (1)
Malmö FF (1)
Mjällby AIF (1)
Varbergs BoIS (1)
Örebro SK (1)
IFK Värnamo (2)

Unseeded
Akropolis IF (2)
Falkenbergs FF (2)
GAIS (2)
GIF Sundsvall (2)
IK Brage (2)
Landskrona BoIS (2)
Trelleborgs FF (2)
Örgryte IS (2)
Östers IF (2)
IF Brommapojkarna (3)
IF Sylvia (3)
Sollentuna FK (3)
Eskilsminne IF (4)
Skiljebo SK (4)
Ytterhogdals IK (4)
Ängelholms FF (4)

Akropolis IF withdrew from the competition and was replaced by Norrby IF.

Group 1

Group 2

Group 3

Group 4

Group 5

Group 6

Group 7

Group 8

Knockout stage

The draw for the quarter-finals and semi-finals was made on March 7, 2022.

Qualified teams

Bracket

Quarter-finals

Semi-finals

Final

Top scorers

References

Svenska Cupen seasons
Cupen
Cupen
Sweden